is a Japanese television jidaigeki or period drama that was broadcast in prime-time on NHK in 2015. Tatsuya Fuji played Maeda Keiji. Kabukimono Keiji depicts the later life of Maeda Keiji who was called Kabukimono.

Plot
Maeda Keiji used to be a famous samurai but now he is spending half retired life at Mukuan(Keiji's fortified resistance) in Yonezawa.

Maeda Keiji secretly raised a child of Ishida Mitsunari as a child of himself but that was known to the Tokugawa shogunate. Tentoku was sent by Tokugawa shogunate as a spy  to demolish Yonezawa han. Maeda Keiji tries to protect his child (Child of Ishida Mitsunari) and  Yonezawa han from Tokugawa shogunate. When his wife is shot and injured by assassins of Tokugawa shogunate, Keiji decides to go to Sunpu castle to meet Tokugawa Ieyasu.

Cast
 Tatsuya Fuji as Maeda Keiji 
 Shōhei Hino as Matakichi
 Mariya Nishiuchi : Sano Maeda (Keiji's daughter)
 Aoi Nakamura as Shinquro Maeda (Mitsunari Ishida's child)
 Kyoko Enami as Mitsu Maeda (Keiji's wife)
 Noriko Aoyama as Hana Maeda
 Tomoko Tabata as Take
 Bibari Maeda as Lady Izumino
 Asuka Kudō as Yasuda Katsunoshin
 Mitsu Dan as Shizuku
 Yuko Fueki as Yukiya
 Masatō Ibu as Tentoku Oshō (A spy from Tokugawa shogunate)

References

2015 Japanese television series debuts
Jidaigeki television series